Boitumelo Ezra Letsoalo is a South African politician who has represented the African National Congress (ANC) in the Gauteng Provincial Legislature since 2019. Formerly an ANC Youth League activist in Tshwane, he has been a member of the Provincial Executive Committee of the ANC's Gauteng branch since 2018.

Political career 
Letsoalo was formerly the Deputy Regional Chairperson of the ANC Youth League's branch in Tshwane, Gauteng; he served under Regional Chairperson Lesego Makhubela. He did not stand for reelection to that office in October 2017. However, the following year, in July 2018, he was elected to a four-year term as a member of the Provincial Executive Committee of the mainstream ANC in Gauteng.

In the 2019 general election, he was elected for the first time to a seat in the Gauteng Provincial Legislature, ranked 11th on the ANC's provincial party list. He was re-elected to the Provincial Executive Committee in July 2022.

References

External links 

 

African National Congress politicians
Living people
Year of birth missing (living people)
Members of the Gauteng Provincial Legislature
21st-century South African politicians